West Blockhouse may refer to a:

 West Blockhouse, a Palmerston Fort in Milford Haven
 West Blockhouse, a 16th-century fortification in Angle, Pembrokeshire